Francisco de Ridder (23 October 1929 – 19 May 2019) was an Argentine alpine skier. He competed in the men's slalom at the 1952 Winter Olympics.

References

1929 births
2019 deaths
Argentine male alpine skiers
Olympic alpine skiers of Argentina
Alpine skiers at the 1952 Winter Olympics
Skiers from Buenos Aires